Creatures of Beauty is a Big Finish Productions audio drama based on the long-running British science fiction television series Doctor Who.

Plot
The Fifth Doctor and Nyssa are arrested on a planet generations after an ecological disaster that has led to disfiguring mutations.

Cast
The Doctor — Peter Davison
Nyssa — Sarah Sutton
The Koteem — Nicholas Briggs
Lady Forleon — Jemma Churchill
Gilbrook — David Daker
Quain — Nigel Hastings
Brodlik — David Mallinson
Veline — Emma Manton
Seedleson — Michael Smiley
Murone — Philip Wolff

External links
Big Finish Productions – Creatures of Beauty

2003 audio plays
Fifth Doctor audio plays
Audio plays by Nicholas Briggs